The year 2004 in birding and ornithology.

Worldwide

New species

See also Bird species new to science described in the 2000s

 The Togian hawk-owl from Indonesia is described as new to science in the Bulletin of the British Ornithologists' Club.
 The Rubeho akalat from Tanzania is described as new to science in the American journal The Auk.
 The Acre antshrike from Brazil is described as new to science in the American journal The Auk.
 The Calayan rail from the Philippines is discovered and described as new to science in the journal Forktail
 The Serendib scops-owl from the Sri Lankan rainforests is described as new to science in the Bulletin of the British Ornithologists' Club
 Mees's nightjar from Flores and Sumba, Indonesia is described as new to science in Zoologische Verhandelingen PDF.

 To be completed

Rediscoveries
 The rusty-throated wren-babbler was rediscovered on 18 November in the Mishmi Hills of eastern Arunachal Pradesh; the species had only previously been known from the type specimen, collected c.50 km away in 1947
 The ivory-billed woodpecker is reported as having been discovered in Arkansas in April, although the reports attract considerable controversy.

 To be completed

Taxonomic developments
 To be completed

Ornithologists

Deaths
7 August - Colin Bibby (born 1948)

Europe

Britain

Breeding birds
Osprey bred for the first time in Wales.

Migrant and wintering birds
 To be completed

Rare birds
 A small influx of long-tailed tits of the white-headed northern race caudatus in the early part of the year gave many British birders their first opportunity to observe this form in Britain.
 Britain's first chestnut-eared bunting and rufous-tailed robin were both found on Fair Isle in October.
 Britain's first purple martin was found on the Butt of Lewis, Outer Hebrides in September.
 Britain's first masked shrike, a juvenile, was found in October at Kilrenny Common in Fife, and seen by large numbers of birders.
 Britains's first Scopoli's shearwater off Isles of Scilly waters on 2 August.
 The third great knot for Britain was seen on the Wyre Estuary, Lancashire in August.
 A cream-coloured courser on the Isles of Scilly during September and October is the first in Britain for 20 years.

Other events
 The British Birdwatching Fair has northern Peru's dry forests as its theme for the year.
 The West Midland Bird Club celebrates its 75th anniversary.

Scandinavia
To be completed

North America
To be completed

References

Birding and ornithology
Birding and ornithology by year
Ornithology